Teresa Utković (born 31 July 1980) is a Swedish handball player of Croatian descent.
Her current club is Aalborg DH.

Teresa's father Branko was from Žerava, a village near Zadar. She has younger brother, Rikard Utković.

References

1980 births
Living people
Handball players from Gothenburg
Swedish female handball players
Swedish people of Croatian descent
Swedish expatriate sportspeople in Denmark